The Blue Ridge Mountains are a physiographic province of the larger Appalachian Mountains range. The mountain range is located in the Eastern United States, and extends 550 miles southwest from southern Pennsylvania through Maryland, West Virginia, Virginia, North Carolina, South Carolina, Tennessee, and Georgia. This province consists of northern and southern physiographic regions, which divide near the Roanoke River gap. To the west of the Blue Ridge, between it and the bulk of the Appalachians, lies the Great Appalachian Valley, bordered on the west by the Ridge and Valley province of the Appalachian range.

The Blue Ridge Mountains are known for having a bluish color when seen from a distance. Trees put the "blue" in Blue Ridge, from the isoprene released into the atmosphere. This contributes to the characteristic haze on the mountains and their perceived color.

Within the Blue Ridge province are two major national parks – the Shenandoah National Park in the northern section, and the Great Smoky Mountains National Park in the southern section. The eight national forests include George Washington and Jefferson, Cherokee, Pisgah, Nantahala and Chattahoochee.

Geography

Although the term "Blue Ridge" is sometimes applied exclusively to the eastern edge or front range of the Appalachian Mountains, the geological definition of the Blue Ridge province extends westward to the Ridge and Valley area, encompassing the Great Smoky Mountains, the Great Balsams, the Roans, the Blacks, the Brushy Mountains (a "spur" of the Blue Ridge) and other mountain ranges.

The Blue Ridge extends as far south as Mount Oglethorpe in Georgia and as far north into Pennsylvania as South Mountain. While South Mountain dwindles to hills between Gettysburg and Harrisburg, the band of ancient rocks that form the core of the Blue Ridge continues northeast through the New Jersey and Hudson River highlands, eventually reaching The Berkshires of Massachusetts and the Green Mountains of Vermont.

The Blue Ridge contains the highest mountains in eastern North America south of Baffin Island. About 125 peaks exceed  in elevation. Southern Sixers is a term used by peak baggers for this group of mountains.

The Blue Ridge Parkway runs  along crests of the Southern Appalachians and links two national parks: Shenandoah and Great Smoky Mountains. In many places along the parkway, there are metamorphic rocks (gneiss) with folded bands of light-and dark-colored minerals, which sometimes look like the folds and swirls in a marble cake.

Geology

Most of the rocks that form the Blue Ridge Mountains are ancient granitic charnockites, metamorphosed volcanic formations, and sedimentary limestone. Recent studies completed by Richard Tollo, a professor and geologist at George Washington University, provide greater insight into the petrologic and geochronologic history of the Blue Ridge basement suites. Modern studies have found that the basement geology of the Blue Ridge is made of compositionally unique gneisses and granitoids, including orthopyroxene-bearing charnockites. Analysis of zircon minerals in the granite completed by John Aleinikoff at the U.S. Geological Survey has provided more detailed emplacement ages.

Many of the features found in the Blue Ridge and documented by Tollo and others have confirmed that the rocks exhibit many similar features in other North American Grenville-age terranes. The lack of a calc-alkaline affinity and zircon ages less than 1.2 billion years old suggest that the Blue Ridge is distinct from the Adirondacks, Green Mountains, and possibly the New York-New Jersey Highlands. The petrologic and geochronologic data suggest that the Blue Ridge basement is a composite orogenic crust that was emplaced during several episodes from a crustal magma source. Field relationships further illustrate that rocks emplaced prior to 1.078–1.064 billion years ago preserve deformational features. Those emplaced post-1.064 billion years ago generally have a massive texture and missed the main episode of Mesoproterozoic compression.

The Blue Ridge Mountains began forming during the Silurian Period over 400 million years ago. Approximately 320 million years ago, North America and Europe collided, pushing up the Blue Ridge. At the time of their emergence, the Blue Ridge were among the highest mountains in the world and reached heights comparable to the much younger Alps.

History

The English who settled colonial Virginia in the early 17th century recorded that the native Powhatan name for the Blue Ridge was Quirank. At the foot of the Blue Ridge, various tribes including the Siouan Manahoacs, the Iroquois, and the Shawnee hunted and fished. A German physician-explorer, John Lederer, first reached the crest of the Blue Ridge in 1669 and again the following year; he also recorded the Virginia Siouan name for the Blue Ridge (Ahkonshuck).

At the Treaty of Albany negotiated by Lieutenant Governor Alexander Spotswood (1676–1740), of Virginia with the Iroquois between 1718 and 1722, the Iroquois ceded lands they had conquered south of the Potomac River and east of the Blue Ridge to the Virginia Colony. This treaty made the Blue Ridge the new demarcation point between the areas and tribes subject to the Six Nations, and those tributaries to the Colony. When colonists began to disregard this by crossing the Blue Ridge and settling in the Shenandoah Valley in the 1730s, the Iroquois began to object, finally selling their rights to the Valley, on the west side of the Blue Ridge, at the Treaty of Lancaster in 1744.

Flora and fauna
The forest environment provides natural habitat for many plants, trees, and animals.

Flora

The Blue Ridge Mountains have stunted oak and oak-hickory forest habitats, which comprise most of the Appalachian slope forests. Flora also includes grass, shrubs, hemlock and mixed-oak pine forests.

While the Blue Ridge range includes the highest summits in the eastern United States, the climate is nevertheless too warm to support an alpine zone, and thus the range lacks the tree line found at lower elevations in the northern half of the Appalachian range. Statistical modelling predicts that the alpine treeline would exist at above 7,985 feet (2434 m) in the climate zone and latitude of the southern Appalachians. The highest parts of the Blue Ridge are generally vegetated in dense Southern Appalachian spruce-fir forests.

Fauna
The area is host to many animals, including
Many species of amphibians and reptiles
Ocoee salamander
A large diversity of fish species, many of which are endemic
American black bear
Songbirds and other bird species
Bobcat
Coyote
Elk
Red fox 
Gray fox
Grouse
Moose
North American River Otter
Whitetail deer
Wild boar
Wild turkey

Population centers
The largest city located in the Blue Ridge Mountains is Roanoke, located in Southwest Virginia, while the largest Metropolitan Area is the Asheville metropolitan area in Western North Carolina. Other notable cities in the Blue Ridge Mountains include Charlottesville, Frederick, Hagerstown, Chambersburg, Greenville, Johnson City, and Lynchburg.

In music and film

The song "Take Me Home, Country Roads," popularized by its co-author John Denver in 1971, prominently mentions the Blue Ridge Mountains along with the Shenandoah River and West Virginia. While the mountains and river are mostly beyond that state's borders, both are partly  found in its Eastern Panhandle. West Virginia named the popular hit its fourth official state song in 2014.
Laurel and Hardy, an early 20th-century comedy duo, featured the song The Trail of the Lonesome Pine (song) containing the lyric "In the Blue Ridge Mountains of Virginia" in their film, "Way Out West" in 1937.
The song Blue Ridge Mountains by American band Fleet Foxes is named for (and prominently refers to) the Blue Ridge Mountains.
The TV series The Waltons is set in the Blue Ridge Mountains.
The Southern Rock band The Marshall Tucker Band wrote a song called “Blue Ridge Mountain Skies” about the range on their 1974 album A New Life
The 2020 album "Roots and Stones" by Scythian features a song titled "Virginia" about a woman who falls in love in the Blue Ridge Mountains
The 1951 movie I'd Climb the Highest Mountain, starring Susan Hayward and William Lundigan, based on the 1910 Corra Mae Harris book A Circuit Rider's Wife, tells the story of a pastor and his new wife as they are assigned a new parish in Georgia's Blue Ridge Mountains, where he tends to the spiritual and emotional needs of his small flock. The film was mostly shot in the Blue Ridge Mountains of northeast Georgia.

See also
Appalachian balds
Appalachian bogs
Appalachian temperate rainforest
Appalachian-Blue Ridge forests
Cove (Appalachian Mountains)
Blue Ridge National Heritage Area

References

Olson, Ted (1998). Blue Ridge Folklife, University Press of Mississippi. .

External links

 
Subranges of the Appalachian Mountains
Mountain ranges of North Carolina
Mountain ranges of Virginia
Mountain ranges of Georgia (U.S. state)
Mountain ranges of Maryland
Mountain ranges of Pennsylvania
Mountain ranges of Tennessee
Mountain ranges of South Carolina
Mountain ranges of West Virginia
Geography of Appalachia
Regions of Tennessee
Appalachia
Appalachian culture
Roanoke River
Shenandoah River
Rappahannock River
Physiographic provinces
Physiographic regions of the United States